Eudonia feredayi is a moth in the family Crambidae. It was described by Henry Guard Knaggs in 1867. This species is endemic to New Zealand.

The wingspan is 18–21 mm. The forewings are reddish ochreous, irrorated (sprinkled) with dark reddish brown. The first line is whitish, dark margined posteriorly. The second line is white, dark margined anteriorly. The hindwings are pale whitish grey, tinged with ochreous. The postmedian line and hindmarginal band are darker grey. Adults have been recorded on wing from January to March.

References

Moths described in 1867
Eudonia
Moths of New Zealand
Endemic fauna of New Zealand
Endemic moths of New Zealand